In enzymology, an arginyltransferase is an enzyme that catalyzes the chemical reaction

L-arginyl-tRNA + protein  tRNA + L-arginyl-protein

Thus, the two substrates of this enzyme are L-arginyl-tRNA and protein, whereas its two products are tRNA and L-arginyl-protein.

This enzyme belongs to the family of transferases, specifically the aminoacyltransferases.  The systematic name of this enzyme class is L-arginyl-tRNA:protein arginyltransferase. Other names in common use include arginine transferase, arginyl-transfer ribonucleate-protein aminoacyltransferase, arginyl-transfer ribonucleate-protein transferase, and arginyl-tRNA protein transferase.  It has 2 cofactors: mercaptoethanol,  and Cation.

References

 
 
 

EC 2.3.2
Enzymes of unknown structure